The women's double National round was one of three archery events on the archery at the 1908 Summer Olympics programme. The competition was held on Friday, 17 July and Saturday, 18 July, with one round each day. The archers had to contend with significant rain and wind on the first day and gusts of wind on the second.

Great Britain was the only nation to enter female archers, ensuring that they swept this event. Queenie Newall, at 53 years of age, set a record for oldest female Olympic gold medalist. Lottie Dod took second place, not quite matching her brother William Dod's gold medal finish in the men's York round. Beatrice Hill-Lowe took bronze.

NOCs were limited to 30 competitors each. Twenty-five archers only from Great Britain competed.

Background
This was the second and final appearance of the event; it was previously held in 1904.

Alice Legh won 23 national championships from 1886 to 1922 and "almost certainly would have won" this event had she competed; she chose not to. Among the archers who did compete, Lottie Dod was the most accomplished sportswoman, though she was best known for playing tennis. Dod had retired from tennis in 1893 and had successful careers in field hockey and golf before turning to archery in the Olympics.

Competition format 
The archers shot a total of 144 arrows each over the two rounds of 72. Each round consisted of 48 arrows at 60 yards (54.8 m) and 24 arrows at 50 yards (45.7 m). Three arrows were shot per end. Each hit was worth 9, 7, 5, 3, or 1 points depending on which ring was hit; an arrow touching two rings would count as hitting the higher value. Ties were broken first by number of hits, then by score at the longest range (60 yards), then by hits at the longest range.

Schedule 
The double National round event was held on the first two days of the archery schedule, along with the men's double Yorkround.

Results
After the first day, the top two archers had separated from the rest. Dod and Newall had each hit 66 targets out of 72; Dod had a slight lead of 348 to 338. Newall was the best archer on day two, having the best round of the tournament with 350. Dod's second day was much worse, however, as she scored only 294 (the sixth-best score of the day). This gave Newall the gold medal, while Dod was able to hang on to second place. Hill-Lowe scored 343 on the second day, a vast improvement over her 275 first-day score and second-best behind Newall, to earn the bronze medal.

Aftermath
Newall would be defeated by Legh by 151 points the next week at the British national championships, though Newall would go on to win in 1911 and 1912.

Women's archery would not be held again until 1972. (Archery was not held in 1912, only men's events were held in 1920, and the sport was absent from the programme from 1924 to 1968.)

References

Sources
 Official Report of the Games of the IV Olympiad (1908).
 De Wael, Herman. Herman's Full Olympians: "Archery 1908". Accessed 8 April 2006.

Women's National round
1908 in women's sport
Arch